These are the records set in the Philippine Basketball Association (PBA) and PBA D-League. Flags indicate the nationality of the player; all Filipinos are treated as locals and all non-Filipinos are imports.

Individual single-game records
Most points:
105 by  Tony Harris (Swift) vs. Ginebra San Miguel, October 10, 1992, at Iloilo City
79 by  Allan Caidic (Presto Tivoli) vs. Ginebra San Miguel, November 21, 1991, at The ULTRA, Pasig
Most points in a half:
59 by  Tony Harris (Swift) vs. Ginebra San Miguel, October 10, 1992, at Iloilo City
53 by  Allan Caidic (Presto Tivoli) vs. Ginebra San Miguel, November 21, 1991, at The ULTRA, Pasig
Most points in a quarter:
37 by  Allan Caidic (Presto Tivoli) vs. Ginebra San Miguel, November 21, 1991, at The ULTRA, Pasig
33 by  Michael Hackett (Ginebra) vs. Great Taste, November 21, 1985, at The ULTRA, Pasig
Most rebounds:
45 by  Michael Hackett (Ginebra) vs. Great Taste, November 24, 1985, at The ULTRA, Pasig
31 by  June Mar Fajardo (San Miguel Beermen) vs. Magnolia, May 15, 2019, at Smart Araneta Coliseum, Quezon City
Most assists:
28 by  Eugene Quilban (7-Up) vs. Shell, August 9, 1992, at PSC-NASA, Pasig
20 by  Terrance Bailey (Presto) vs. Alaska, November 2, 1989, at The ULTRA, Pasig
Most steals:
11 by  Damian Owens (Sta. Lucia) vs. Red Bull, December 9, 2005, at Cuneta Astrodome
10 by  Ryan Reyes (Talk 'N Text, 2011–12 Philippine Cup Finals) vs. Powerade Tigers, January 29, 2012, at Smart Araneta Coliseum, Quezon City
Most blocks:
13 by  Andrew Fields (Toyota) vs. Crispa, April 21, 1981
11 by  Jerry Codiñera (Purefoods) vs. San Miguel, October 3, 1989
Most turnovers:
13 by  Michael Hackett (Ginebra) vs. Great Taste, November 24, 1985
12 by  Danny Ildefonso (San Miguel) vs. Pop Cola, March 4, 2001, at PhilSports Arena
12 by  Asi Taulava (Mobiline) vs. San Miguel, March 14, 1999
12 by  Marlou Aquino (Ginebra) vs. Sunkist, March 5, 1996
Most minutes and seconds:
63 by  Lambert Shell (Sta. Lucia) vs. San Miguel (3 overtimes), November 9, 1993
61:02 by  Christian Standhardinger (NorthPort Batang Pier) vs. NLEX (3 overtimes), November 27, 2019
Most two-point field goals made:
31 by  Paul Alvarez (Alaska) vs Shell, April 26, 1990 
Most three-point field goals made:
17 by  Allan Caidic (Presto Tivoli) vs. Ginebra San Miguel, November 21, 1991, at The ULTRA, Pasig
14 by  Jose Slaughter (Hills Bros.) vs. Great Taste, October 18, 1987
Most three-point field goals made in a quarter
9 by  Allan Caidic (Presto Tivoli) vs. Ginebra San Miguel, November 21, 1991, at The ULTRA, Pasig
9 by  Ren-Ren Ritualo (FedEx Express) vs. Red Bull Barako, April 29, 2005, at Ynares Center, Antipolo
Most consecutive three-point field goals made:
9 by  Don Trollano (NLEX Road Warriors) vs Terrafirma Dyip, March 2, 2023 at Araneta Coliseum
Best field-goal percentage in a game:
12/12 (100%) by  Ali Peek (Coca-Cola) vs. Alaska, March 10, 2006
Most free throws made in a game
43 by  Tony Harris (Swift) vs. Ginebra San Miguel, October 10, 1992, at Iloilo City
24 by  Nelson Asaytono (Swift) vs. Purefoods Tender Juicy Hotdogs, July 2, 1992

All-Star Game records
Most points:
48 by Terrence Romeo (Gilas Pilipinas), 2018, Batangas City Coliseum, Batangas City
Most rebounds:
27 by Calvin Abueva (Smart PBA All-Stars), 2018, University of San Agustin Gym, Iloilo City
Most assists:
17 by Jimmy Alapag (South All-Stars), 2015, Palawan City Coliseum, Palawan
Most three-point field goals made:
9 by Allan Caidic (North All-Stars) vs. South All-Stars, 1993, Cuneta Astrodome, Pasay
9 by Paul Lee (North All-Stars) vs. South All-Stars, 2019, Calasiao Sports Complex, Pangasinan

PBA Finals records 

 Most rebounds:
31 by  June Mar Fajardo (San Miguel, 2019 Philippine Cup Finals) vs. Magnolia, May 15, 2019, at Smart Araneta Coliseum, Quezon City
 Most steals:
10 by  Ryan Reyes (Talk 'N Text, 2011–12 Philippine Cup Finals) vs. Powerade Tigers, January 29, 2012, at Smart Araneta Coliseum, Quezon City
 Most three-point field goals made:
 10 by  Mikey Williams (TNT Tropang Giga, 2021 Philippine Cup Finals) vs. Magnolia Hotshots, October 24, 2021, at the Don Honorio Ventura State University Gymnasium

Team single-game records
Most points:
197 by Ginebra (vs. Great Taste, 168), November 21, 1985
Most points in a lost game:
178 by Pepsi (vs. Purefoods, 182), October 4, 1990 (triple overtime)
Most points in a half:
112 by Ginebra (vs. Great Taste, 2nd half), November 21, 1985
Most points in a quarter:
65 by Presto (vs. Swift, 4th quarter), 161–179, October 18, 1992
Fewest points:
47 by Shell (vs. Mobiline, 79), May 3, 2000
Fewest points in a won game:
54 by Pop Cola (vs. Shell, 52), July 18, 1999
54 by Sta. Lucia (vs. Purefoods, 53), May 22, 2005
Fewest points in a half:
18 by Shell (vs. Mobiline), May 3, 2000
Fewest combined points in a half:
12 by Mobiline (5) and Alaska (7), May 23, 1998, at Urdaneta, Pangasinan
Fewest points in a quarter:
2 by Mobiline (1st quarter), vs. Sta. Lucia, 69–71, February 26, 2001
2 by Barangay Ginebra (3rd quarter), vs. Coca-Cola, April 26, 2003
2 by NorthPort (3rd quarter), vs Rain or Shine, 68–70, October 18, 2020
2 by Blackwater (1st quarter), vs NLEX, 68–98, July 15, 2022
Most combined points by both teams:
365 points by Ginebra (197) and Great Taste (168), November 21, 1985
Fewest combined points by both teams:
106 points by Pop Cola (54) and Shell (52), July 18, 1999
Most three-point field goals made:
23 by Talk 'N Text vs. Air21, April 23, 2008
23 by Talk 'N Text vs. San Miguel, January 14, 2009
23 by San Miguel vs. Terrafirma, September 21, 2018
23 by NLEX vs. Terrafirma, March 3, 2023
Fewest turnovers:
3 by TNT vs San Miguel, August 29, 2022 (2022 Philippine Cup Finals, Game 4)
Biggest winning margin:
55 by U/Tex (154) vs. Great Taste (99), July 12, 1980
Biggest winning margin in a playoff game:
54 points by Shell (154) vs. Tanduay (100), November 16, 1986
Most consecutive unanswered points:
32–0 (fourth quarter), from 80–85 (8:31) to 112–85 (1:43), Ginebra 116, Shell 90, May 14, 1991 (1991 First Conference Finals, Game 5)
Most consecutive unanswered points from the start of a game
17–0 (12:00 to 7:27), Talk 'N Text (vs. Alaska), June 15, 2011
17–0 (12:00 to 7:56), TNT (vs. San Miguel), June 23, 2017
17–0 (12:00 to 7:47), Barangay Ginebra (vs. San Miguel), August 3, 2018
Best free-throw percentage in a game:
32/32 (100%) by  Purefoods Hotdogs, November 26, 1989, at The ULTRA, Pasig
Most technical fouls by a team:
9 by Mobiline (97), vs. Shell (109), December 1, 1998
Most combined technical fouls by both teams:
16 by Alaska (9) and Shell (7), October 25, 1997 (1997 Governors' Cup Elimination round)
16 by Alaska (8) and GlobalPort (8), January 6, 2016 (2015–16 Philippine Cup semifinals, Game 2)
Most disqualifications:
7 by Pepsi, 178 (vs. Purefoods, 182) (triple overtime), October 4, 1990
Most combined disqualifications by both teams:
9 by CDCP (5) and St. George (4), August 27, 1981
9 by Pepsi (7) and Purefoods (2), (triple overtime), October 4, 1990
9 by Purefoods (5) and Red Bull (4), (triple overtime), May 22, 2004

All-Star Game records
Most points (winning team):
185 by North All-Stars vs South All-Stars 2019
Most points (losing team):
170 by South All-Stars vs North All-Stars 2019
Most combined points by both teams:
355 by North All-Stars and South All-Stars 2019
Most points in a half:
95 by Veterans vs. Rookies-Sophomores-Juniors 2012
Most combined three-point field goals made
45 by North All-Stars and South All-Stars 2019
Biggest winning margin
32 by Veterans vs. Rookies-Sophomores-Juniors 2012

PBA Finals records 

 Fewest points in a quarter:
 5 by San Miguel (2nd quarter) vs. Magnolia, May 15, 2019 (2019 Philippine Cup Finals, Game 7)
 5 by Alaska (1st quarter) vs. San Miguel, January 7, 2015 (2014–15 Philippine Cup Finals, Game 1) 
 Most three-point field goals made:
 18 by San Miguel vs. TNT, August 7, 2019 (2019 Commissioner's Cup Finals, Game 2) 
 Fewest turnovers:
 3 by TNT vs San Miguel, August 29, 2022 (2022 Philippine Cup Finals, Game 4)
 Biggest winning margin:
 38 by San Miguel (132) vs. Barangay Ginebra (94), August 1, 2018 (2018 Commissioner's Cup Finals, Game 3)
 38 by Alaska (99) vs. San Miguel (61), May 5, 1998 (1998 PBA All-Filipino Cup Finals, Game 6)

Team season records
Most consecutive wins: 21 by the 1983 Crispa Redmanizers (12 in the All-Filipino Conference, 9 in the Reinforced Filipino Conference; March 10 – June 19, 1983)
Most consecutive wins in a conference: 19 by the 1980 Crispa Redmanizers (All-Filipino Conference, September 30 – December 9, 1980)
Most consecutive losses: 29 by the 2020–2022 Blackwater Elite/Bossing (8 games in the 2020 Philippine Cup, all 11 games in the 2021 Philippine Cup; 10 games in the 2021 Governors' Cup; October 20, 2020 – March 4, 2022)
Most consecutive losses in a conference: 14 by the 2011–12 Shopinas.com Clickers (Philippine Cup) (October 5 – December 8, 2011)

Individual career records
Most seasons played:
23 by Robert Jaworski
23 by Asi Taulava
Most points:
18,996 by  Ramon Fernandez in 1,074 games
11,314 by  Norman Black in 282 games
Most assists:
5,825 by  Robert Jaworski
Best scoring average per game:
46.2 by  Billy Ray Bates
23.1 by  Ricardo Brown
 Most games:
1,081 by  Abet Guidaben
Most free throws:
3,848 by  Ramon Fernandez
Most consecutive free throw shots made:
76 by  Allan Caidic
Best free throw percentage:
87.6% by  Ricardo Brown
Most three-point field goals made in a single season:
160 (1990 PBA season) by  Allan Caidic
Most three-point field goals made in a career:
1,250 by  Jimmy Alapag
Youngest player:
18 years old –  Nick Bulaong
Oldest player:
53 years old –  Robert Jaworski

All-Star Game records
Most selections:
17 by Asi Taulava
17 by James Yap
Most MVP awards: 
4 by Vergel Meneses (1995, 1998, 2000, 2003)

League single-game records
Longest game: 3 overtimes (13 occasions)
2019 PBA Governors' Cup Quarterfinals – NorthPort Batang Pier vs. NLEX Road Warriors – 126–123 (November 27, 2019, Smart Araneta Coliseum, Quezon City)
2017–18 PBA Philippine Cup Elimination round – Barangay Ginebra San Miguel vs. Rain or Shine Elasto Painters – 100–92 (March 2, 2018, Smart Araneta Coliseum, Quezon City)
2016 PBA Commissioner's Cup Elimination round – San Miguel Beermen vs. NLEX Road Warriors – 131–127 (April 5, 2016, Smart Araneta Coliseum, Quezon City)
2015 PBA Commissioner's Cup Elimination round – Purefoods Star Hotshots vs. Talk 'N Text Tropang Texters – 118–117 (March 14, 2015, University of the South Eastern Philippines Gym, Davao)
2010–11 PBA Philippine Cup Elimination round – Meralco Bolts vs. Rain or Shine Elasto Painters – 125–124 (December 15, 2010, Araneta Coliseum, Quezon City)
2006–07 PBA Philippine Cup Elimination round – Purefoods Chunkee Giants vs. Talk 'N Text Phone Pals – 109–103 (October 25, 2006)
2004–05 PBA Philippine Cup Classification round – Red Bull Barako vs. Sta. Lucia Realtors – 124–118 (October 26, 2004, University of St. La Salle Gymnasium, Bacolod)
2004 PBA Fiesta Conference Elimination round – Red Bull Barako vs. Purefoods TJ Hotdogs – 141–138 (May 22, 2004, Ynares Center, Antipolo)
1993 PBA Governors' Cup Semifinals – Sta. Lucia Realtors vs. San Miguel Beermen – 135–129 (November 9, 1993, Cuneta Astrodome, Pasay)
1990 PBA Third Conference Elimination round – Purefoods Hotdogs vs. Pepsi Hotshots – 182–178 (October 4, 1990, The ULTRA, Pasig)
1984 PBA Invitational Championship Elimination round – Great Taste Coffee Makers vs. Gilbey's Gin Tonics – 170–162 (December 6, 1984, Araneta Coliseum, Quezon City)
1983 PBA Open Conference Elimination round – Toyota Super Corollas vs. Gilbey's Gin Tonics – 136–130 (October 30, 1983, Araneta Coliseum, Quezon City)
1976 PBA Second Conference Elimination round – Norikate Porcelainmakers vs. Tanduay Rhum – 153–151 (August 17, 1976, Araneta Coliseum, Quezon City)
Largest attendance at a game:
54,589 on January 15, 2023, Ginebra vs. Bay Area Dragons at the Philippine Arena

PBA D-League records
Most points:
180 by BRT Sumisip Basilan-St. Clare
Most points (losing team)
122 by Black Mamba Energy Drink
Fewest points:
41 by PC Gilmore Wizards 
Fewest points (winning team):
50 by Big Chill Super Chargers
Most points (combined):
297 by BRT Sumisip Basilan-St. Clare and Hyperwash Vipers
Fewest points (combined):
96 by Jumbo Plastic Linoleum Giants and Big Chill Super Chargers
Biggest winning margin:
76 by Tanduay Light Rhum Masters vs Zark's Burgers, July 10, 2017
Most points in a quarter:
60 by BRT Sumisip Basilan-St. Clare
Fewest points in a quarter:
3 by Gamboa Coffee Lovers
Most points in a half:
108 by BRT Sumisip Basilan-St. Clare
Fewest points in a half:
13 by Gamboa Coffee Lovers
Longest winning streak:
24 by NLEX Road Warriors
Longest losing streak:
15 by Topstar ZC Mindanao Aguilas
Most points in a game (individual):
67 by Eliud Poligrates
67 by Jonathan Parreño
Most rebounds in a game (individual):
29 by Jay-R Taganas

References

Philippine Basketball Association lists
Philippine Basketball Association lore